Carl Frommel is an Australian former professional rugby league footballer who played for the Canberra Raiders in the New South Wales Rugby Football League (NSWRFL).

Biography
Born in Canberra, Frommel has a background in rugby union, but played rugby league with the Queanbeyan Blues for several seasons before joining the Raiders in his late 20s. He was a regarded as a fitness fanatic and had a high tackle rate.

Frommel was Canberra's lock in the club's first ever premiership season in 1982, where he featured in a total of 25 first-grade games. He missed only one round for Canberra that season, which made him the second most capped player of 1982 behind Jon Hardy.

References

External links
Carl Frommel at Rugby League project

Year of birth missing (living people)
Living people
Australian rugby league players
Canberra Raiders players
Rugby league locks
Rugby league players from Canberra